The Medical Arts Building in the Oakland neighborhood  of Pittsburgh, Pennsylvania is a building of the University of Pittsburgh Medical Center.

It is the headquarters of the Association of American Cancer Institutes.

It is an Art Deco-style building built in 1932.

References

Art Deco architecture in Pennsylvania
Buildings and structures in Pittsburgh